Barnby in the Willows is a civil parish in the Newark and Sherwood district of Nottinghamshire, England.  The parish contains six listed buildings that are recorded in the National Heritage List for England.   Of these, one is listed at Grade I, the highest of the three grades, and the others are at Grade II, the lowest grade. The parish contains the village of Barnby in the Willows and the surrounding countryside.  The listed buildings consist of a church, a circular dovecote, a public house, a village hall and two houses.


Key

Buildings

References

Citations

Sources

 

Lists of listed buildings in Nottinghamshire